Brown is a color.

Brown may also refer to:

Places

In the United States
Brown, California, an unincorporated community
Brown, Louisiana, an unincorporated community
Brown, Nevada, a ghost town
Brown, Oklahoma, an unincorporated community
Brown, West Virginia, a former unincorporated community
Brown County (disambiguation), several counties in the United States
Brown Township (disambiguation), several townships in the United States

Elsewhere
Brown (crater), lunar crater
Brown Point, South Australia, Australia
Brown Valley, a valley in Antarctica
Cape Brown (Greenland)

People with the name
Brown (surname), a common surname
List of people with surname Brown
People with the given name
Brown Bannister (born 1951), American  contemporary Christian music producer and songwriter, member of the Gospel Hall of Fame
Brown Ferguson (born 1981), Scottish football player and manager
Brown Holmes (1907–1974), American screenwriter

Arts, entertainment, and media

Music
Brown (Grotus album)
Brown (P.O.D. album)

Other uses in arts, entertainment, and media
"Brown", a Teletubbies episode
Brown 25, a fictitious product from the movie The Groove Tube (1974)
Brown, a brown bear character for the Line chatting app
Cedric, Douglas, and Malcolm Brown, aka the Brown Brothers, characters in the 2016 television series Frontier

Brands and enterprises
Brown, the nickname for United Parcel Service (UPS), originating from the color of its delivery trucks and uniforms
Brown & Brown, an insurance and reinsurance company
Brown Brothers Harriman & Co. or BBH, a private bank
Brown Company, defunct American pulp and paper-making company
Brown Estate, a vineyard in St. Helena, California
Brown Shipbuilding, a World War II American shipbuilding company

Military
Fort Brown, Texas, a former US Army post
, two US Navy vessels

Schools and school stadiums
Brown College (disambiguation), several colleges
Brown Field (Valparaiso University), a multi-purpose stadium
Brown University, a private Ivy League university in Providence, Rhode Island
Brown Bears, athletic teams representing Brown University
Brown Stadium, the football and outdoor track stadium of Brown University

Other uses
Brown (racial classification)
Brown v. Board of Education, landmark decision of the United States Supreme Court
Brown Station, an Argentine Antarctic base and scientific research station
Brown-brown, a form of powdered cocaine or heroin
Satyrinae, a subfamily of butterflies commonly called the browns
Browning (partial cooking), the process of partially cooking the surface of meat

See also

Braun (disambiguation)
Brown Building (disambiguation)
Brown Hotel (disambiguation)
Brown Island (disambiguation)
Brown Mountain (disambiguation)
Brown River (disambiguation)
Browne (surname)
Brownie (disambiguation)
Browning (disambiguation)
Browns (disambiguation)
Charles Brown (disambiguation)
Justice Brown (disambiguation)
Mount Brown (disambiguation)